Lielupe  is a residential area and neighbourhood of the city Jūrmala, Latvia.

The Lielupe railway station was established in 1913.

References

External links 

Neighbourhoods in Jūrmala